West Horndon is a village and civil parish in the south of the Borough of Brentwood, Essex on the boundary with Thurrock. It is located 20 miles (32 km) east north-east of Charing Cross in London. The civil parish also includes East Horndon and Dunton Hills.

The village has its own parish council and forms part of the 'Herongate, Ingrave and West Horndon' ward of Brentwood Council. The local school is West Horndon Primary School, and the village falls within the Brentwood County High catchment area. West Horndon parish was abolished in 1934 and created again in 2003 with new boundaries following a petition by residents in 2002.

History

West Horndon was an ancient parish in the Barnstable hundred of Essex. It was grouped into the Billericay poor law union and rural sanitary district. It became part of Billericay Rural District in 1894. In 1934 the parish was abolished when it became part of Brentwood Urban District.

The parish abolished in 1934 was an elongated area stretching north–south in common with neighbouring parishes. East Horndon was a separate parish to the east and the next parish to the west was Little Warley. The population of West Horndon in 1931 was 147. The village began to grow with the 1938 establishment of Rotary Hoes, a manufacturer of trenching machinery.  House-building continued in the 1950s for commuters to London as well as workers at Rotary Hoes.  In 1975, Rotary Hoes left West Horndon for Lowestoft and closed shortly afterwards.

The civil parish formed in 2003, with significantly different boundaries, is perpendicular to the former parish, stretching east–west to incorporate territory formerly part of the parishes of Childerditch, Dunton, East Horndon, Little Warley and West Horndon. In each of these former parishes the inner part is now part of West Horndon and the northern and southern extremities (and eastern part for Dunton) is outside the parish.

Geography
The parish includes the settlements of East Horndon, Dunton Hills and West Horndon. It is predominately a rural parish with large sections of open land within the Metropolitan Green Belt. Within the main settlement of West Horndon village are some streets of suburban houses and a small area of light industrial use. To the southeast of the parish is the Dunton Hills golf course. Little Warley in the northwest is the other main area of activity with some houses and the Clearview sports centre. East Horndon is a scattered settlement to the northeast and is partially located north of the A127 Southend Arterial Road. The entire parish is within the post town of Brentwood in the CM postcode area.

The entire southern boundary with the unparished borough of Thurrock is the London, Tilbury and Southend railway line, with a small deviation to include all of West Horndon railway station. The western boundary with the unparished area of Great Warley is the Mardyke river, where the parish touches the eastern Greater London boundary at North Ockendon. The northern boundary is partially formed by the Southend Arterial Road, with some land to the northeast of it included in the parish. The eastern boundary is with the Borough of Basildon.

Locale
The village is surrounded by open countryside and an industrial estate. It is the first area east of London to not be continuously built up. There are hills rising as high as 100 metres covered in trees, arable fields and fenland of London clay.

There are several streams running down from the hills into the Mar Dyke which drains the fens out to the Thames at Purfleet. There was a time when it was planned to make the Mardyke into a canal but it was never brought to fruition.

Thorndon Avenue is a long straight road leading to the heart of the modern village of West Horndon. Halfway down is the junior school with playing fields at the back and opposite is the modern church of St Francis. At the centre of the village is a village hall which was built around 1961. On the other side of Station Road (which runs through the centre of the village) is a housing estate, consisting of meandering roads and cul-de-sacs, bordered at the rear by the railway line. Road names on this estate are named after places in Essex, namely Fyfield Close, Clavering Gardens, Witham Gardens, Dunmow Gardens and Chafford Gardens. More modern housing exists off both sides of Station Road towards the Industrial estate and railway station.

Transport
West Horndon railway station is a station on the London, Tilbury and Southend main line from London to Southend. The Railway Hotel, behind the station, was once a coaching inn. North of the town and parallel to the railway is the A127 Southend Arterial Road. West Horndon is east of junction 29 of the M25 motorway.

The village is served by two bus routes which both terminate in Brentwood.

History

Originally there were three manors in the area of West Horndon, Tillingham Hall being the one which had most of the land in its borders. In 1066 Alwin, a free woman held it, but by 1086 it had passed to Swain of Essex in the hundred of Barstable. Following this the Tillingham family held the hall for several hundred years.

It was eventually sold to Sir William Bawd, who conveyed it to Coggeshall Abbey, where it remained until the Dissolution of the Monasteries. It is thought that the Abbey began to restrict the rights of the commons, for there were many proceedings in the manor-courts against the ordinary people, supposedly trespassing on the land of the lords. After they acquired the commonland it was mostly left as wild heath and woods, much as we see it today, the later lords of the manor having much pleasure hunting to hounds through it, even as far as Southend.

The church of All Saints is built entirely of brick, the present one being the third on this site. The village of Torinduna (Thornhill) referred to in Domesday was built around this hill. The Saxon church was built around AD 807, then rebuilt in the Norman style by the Neville family about 1200.

In 1930, three houses were given to farm workers. Only one remains at 18 Thorndon Avenue, which has been restored to its original condition.  The rest of Thorndon Avenue was constructed during the 1950s.

The southern portion of the traditional parish of West Horndon is now in the unitary authority of Thurrock.

Nearest places
 East Horndon
 Upminster
 North Ockendon
 Bulphan
 Warley
 Laindon

References

External links

West Horndon Parish Council

Villages in Essex
Civil parishes in Essex
Borough of Brentwood